Glorious Betsy is a 1928 silent film with talking sequences. It is based on the 1908 play of the same name by Rida Johnson Young, and it stars Dolores Costello. It was produced by Warner Bros. and nominated for an Academy Award for Best Writing, Adaptation in 1929. The film was directed by Alan Crosland with cinematography by Hal Mohr. A mute print of this film survives in the Library of Congress, and while the copy is missing some of the sound reels, it's unknown whether other copies of the sound have been preserved elsewhere. Vitaphone track survive incomplete at UCLA Film and Television Archive.

Although the film was written by both Anthony Coldeway and Jack Jarmuth (the latter credited only for title cards); only Coldeway was nominated for the Academy Award.

Plot
The film is a semi-historical narrative and depicts the real-life courtship, marriage, and forced breakup of Jérôme Bonaparte, brother of Napoleon, and his wife from the American South, Elizabeth Patterson. Napoleon did not approve of the union (despite the fact that her family was one of the wealthiest in America), and the marriage was annulled. Jérôme was subsequently forced to marry Catharina of Württemberg. They had one child, depicted in the film, Jérôme Napoleon Bonaparte. In order to provide a "happy ending", Jérôme in the film leaves France to be with his wife. However, in historical fact he remained in Europe.

Production
The film is based on the 1908 Broadway play written by Rida Johnson Young and starring Mary Mannering. It was produced by Lee and Jake Shubert, and opened at the Lyric Theatre on September 7, 1908. It only ran 24 performances and closed in September 1908. Future film players Charles Clary, Harrison Ford, and Maude Turner Gordon had roles in the production.

Cast
Dolores Costello as Betsy Patterson
Conrad Nagel as Jérôme Bonaparte
John Miljan as Preston
Marc McDermott as Colonel Patterson
Pasquale Amato as Napoleon Bonaparte
Michael Vavitch as Capt. St. Pierre
Andrés de Segurola as Capt. Du Fresne
Paul Panzer as The Ship's Captain
Clarissa Selwynne as Aunt Mary
Betty Blythe as Princess Frederick

Premiere Vitaphone short films
Glorious Betsy premiered at Warners Theatre in New York City on April 26, 1928.

Box office
According to records at Warner Bros., the film earned $815,000 in the U.S. and $153,000 in other markets.

See also

 List of early Warner Bros. talking features

References

External links
 
 Glorious Betsy at SilentEra
 
 Poster of Glorious Betsy

1928 films
American black-and-white films
Transitional sound drama films
American films based on plays
Warner Bros. films
American silent feature films
Films directed by Alan Crosland
Films set in the 1800s
Depictions of Napoleon on film
1920s historical drama films
American historical drama films
1928 drama films
1920s American films
Silent American drama films
1920s English-language films